David Cafimipon Gomis (born 21 December 1992) is a professional footballer who plays as a forward for Azerbaijan Premier League club Sabail FK. Born in France, he represents the Guinea-Bissau national team.

Club career
Gomis signed with Gazélec Ajaccio on 20 July 2017 after successful seasons with Sporting Club Toulon in the lower divisions of France. He made his professional debut with Gazélec Ajaccio in a 1–1 Ligue 2 tie against Valenciennes FC on 28 July 2017.

International career
Born in France, Gomis is of Senegalese and Bissau-Guinean descent. Gomis was called up by Guinea-Bissau in late May 2021. He debuted with the Guinea-Bissau national team in a 4–2 2022 FIFA World Cup qualification win over Sudan on 7 September 2021.

References

External links
 
 
 

1992 births
Sportspeople from Toulon
Footballers from Provence-Alpes-Côte d'Azur
Bissau-Guinean people of Senegalese descent
French sportspeople of Senegalese descent
French people of Bissau-Guinean descent
Living people
French footballers
Bissau-Guinean footballers
Guinea-Bissau international footballers
Association football forwards
ÉFC Fréjus Saint-Raphaël players
SC Toulon players
Gazélec Ajaccio players
Clermont Foot players
Pau FC players
Sabail FK players
Ligue 2 players
Championnat National players
Championnat National 2 players
Championnat National 3 players
Azerbaijan Premier League players
Bissau-Guinean expatriate footballers
Expatriate footballers in Azerbaijan
Bissau-Guinean expatriate sportspeople in Azerbaijan